Farinacci is an Italian surname. Notable people with the surname include:

Daniella Farinacci, Australian actress of Italian descent
Jorge Farinacci (1949–2006), Puerta Rican politician
Prospero Farinacci (1554–1618), Italian lawyer and judge
Roberto Farinacci (1892–1945), Italian politician

Italian-language surnames